SS Mission San Luis Rey was a Type T2-SE-A2 tanker built for the United States Maritime Commission during World War II. After the war she was acquired by the United States Navy as USS Mission San Luis Rey (AO-128). Later the tanker transferred to the Military Sea Transportation Service as USNS Mission San Luis Rey (T-AO-128).

Career 
Mission San Luis Rey was laid down 15 October 1943 under a Maritime Commission contract by Marine Ship Corporation, Sausalito, California; launched 29 January 1944; sponsored by Mrs. T. L. Phillips; and delivered 31 March 1944. Chartered to Pacific Tankers, Inc. for operations, she spent the remainder of the War carrying fuel to Allied bases overseas (during which time she was awarded the National Defense Service Medal). She served in this capacity until 29 March 1946 when she was returned to the Maritime Commission and laid up in the Maritime Reserve Fleet at James River, Virginia.

Acquired by the Navy 23 October 1947 she was placed in service with the Naval Transportation Service as Mission San Luis Rey (AO-128) and remained in this service until 1 October 1949 when she was transferred to the newly created Military Sea Transportation Service for duty as USNS Mission San Luis Rey (T-AO-128). She remained in this capacity until 6 May 1955 when she was returned to the Maritime Administration (MARAD) and laid up in the Maritime Reserve Fleet at Suisun Bay, California. She was struck from the Naval Vessel Register on 22 June 1955.

Reacquired by the Navy on 22 June 1956 she was placed in service with MSTS. She served with MSTS until 19 November 1957 when she was again struck from the U.S. Naval Vessel Register on that same date and transferred to the Maritime Administration for lay up in the Maritime Reserve Fleet at Beaumont, Texas.

Sold as scrap on 7 November 1972 for $103,133.00. Removed from Beaumont on December 18, 1972 to be towed to breakers.

References

 
 
 

 

Type T2-SE-A2 tankers
Ships built in Sausalito, California
1944 ships
World War II tankers of the United States
San Luis Rey
Type T2-SE-A2 tankers of the United States Navy